Hibbertia ericifolia is a species of flowering plant in the family Dilleniaceae and is endemic to south-eastern Australia. It is small, sometimes low-lying to spreading shrub with wiry stems, linear to narrow elliptic leaves, and yellow flowers arranged on the ends of branchlets, with ten to twenty-four stamens arranged around the three carpels.

Description
The flowers are arranged singly on the ends of branchlets and are more or less sessile, with up to three lance-shaped to spatula-shaped bracts at the base. There are between ten and twenty-four stamens arranged around the three carpels. each containing four ovules. Flowering mainly occurs from September to February.

Taxonomy
Hibbertia ericifolia was first formally described in 1855 by Joseph Dalton Hooker in The botany of the Antarctic voyage of H.M. Discovery ships Erebus and Terror from a specimen collected by Ronald Campbell Gunn. The specific epithet (ericifolia) means "Erica-leaved".

Long considered conspecific with Hibbertia serpyllifolia after George Bentham combined the two in his Flora Australiensis, H. ericifolia is now recognised as distinct and is found in south-eastern Australia.

Distribution and habitat
This hibbertia occurs on the coast and tablelands of New South Wales south from the Central Coast, in adjacent areas of Victoria, and on the tablelands of Tasmania. It usually grows on rocky soils, often in woodland.

References

ericifolia
Flora of New South Wales
Flora of Victoria (Australia)
Flora of Tasmania
Taxa named by Joseph Dalton Hooker
Plants described in 1855